The following is a timeline of the history of the city of Helsinki, Finland.

Prior to 19th century

 1550 - Trading town established by Gustav I of Sweden.
 1569 - City privileges granted.
 1570 - Fire.
 1616 - "Diet of Finland held in Helsinki."
 1640 - Helsinki relocated across  bay to Vironniemi"
 1654 - Fire.
 1695 - Famine begins.
 1710 - Plague.
 1713 - Helsinki taken by Russian forces.
 1727 -  built.
 1742 - Helsinki occupied by Russians again.
 1743 - Herring fair begins.
 1748 - Sveaborg fortress construction begins.
 1757 -  built.

19th century

 1808
 Suomenlinna fortress surrenders to Russia.
 Fire.
 1810 - Population: 4,065.
 1812
 Helsinki becomes capital of Grand Duchy of Finland.
 Esplanadi park opens.
 1815 -  established.
 1819 - Sinebrychoff Brewery founded.
 1822 - Government Palace built.
 1826 - Helsinki Old Church built.
 1827 - Engels Teater, the first theatre, is built.
 1828 - The Royal Academy of Turku relocates to Helsinki.
 1829 - Hietaniemi cemetery and University of Helsinki Botanical Garden established.
 1838 - Kaivohuone built.
 1846 - Finnish Art Society and symphony orchestra founded.
 1847 - Suometar newspaper begins publication.
 1848 - Drawing school established.
 1849 - Helsinki University of Technology founded.
 1852
 St Nicholas' Church built.
 "Students Library" established.
 1860
 Swedish Theatre built.
 Population: 22,228.
 1862 - First Helsinki railway station opens with service to Hämeenlinna.
 1864 - Hufvudstadsbladet newspaper begins publication.
 1868 - Uspenski Cathedral built.
 1870 - St. Petersburg-Helsinki railway built.
 1871 - University of Arts and Design founded.
 1872 - .
 1875 - City Council of Helsinki established.
 1879 - Alexander Theatre built.
 1881 - Rikhardinkatu Library opens.
 1882
 Helsinki Music Institute and Helsinki Philharmonic Orchestra established.
 Population: 45,919.
 1884 - Electric power plant begins operating.
 1886 - Kaivopuisto park established.
 1887 - Ateneum and Hotel Kämp built.
 1888 - Kauppahalli built.
 1889
 Zoo opens.
 Päivälehti and Helsingin Sanomat newspapers begin publication.
 1890 - Population: 61,530.
 1891
 Horse-drawn tram begins operating.
 Fazer in business.
 1893
 Helsinki harbour rail begins operating.
 Winter garden opens.
 1894 - Statue of Alexander II of Russia erected in Senate Square.
 1895 - Demari newspaper begins publication.
 1896 - Population: 77,484.
 1898 - Kauppalehti newspaper in publication.
 1900 - Electric tram begins operating.

20th century

1900s-1940s
 1902 - Finnish National Theatre building constructed.
 1904
 Governor-General Nikolai Ivanovich Bobrikov assassinated by Eugen Schauman.
 Population: 111,654.
 1906
 26 February: 1906 Helsinki bank robbery.
 Helsinki Synagogue built.
 1908 - Helsinki Workers' House built.
 1909 - Seurasaari Open-Air Museum and  established.
 1911
 Helsinki School of Economics founded.
 Domestic Opera founded.
 Helsinki City Museum opens.
 1912 - Helsinki Stock Exchange founded.
 1917
 May:  occurs.
 Helsinki Workers' Council formed.
 1916 - National Museum of Finland opens.
 1918
 Civil war.
 British submarine flotilla in harbor.
 1919
 16 May: Victory day.
 Helsinki Central railway station, designed by Eliel Saarinen, opens.
 Population: 187,544.
 1922 - Arthur Castrén becomes mayor.
 1924 - Natural History Museum of Helsinki established.
 1926
 Yleisradio begins broadcasting.
 Citizens' College Helsinki founded.
 1928 -  opens.
 1930 - Population: 205,833.
 1931
 Antti Tulenheimo becomes mayor.
 Parliament House built.
 Hotel Torni opens.
 1932
 Eläintarhan ajot (motor race) begins.
 Ilta-Sanomat newspaper begins publication.
 1936 - Lasipalatsi built.
 1937 - Savoy hotel founded.
 1938
 May: Second International Aeronautic Exhibition held.
 Helsinki-Malmi Airport and Stadium open.
 Klaus Kurki hotel established.
 Tennispalatsi built.
 1939 - Bombing by Soviets.
 1944
 Bombing by Soviets.
  becomes mayor.
 1946 - Haaga, Huopalahti, Kulosaari, and Oulunkylä become part of city.
 1947 - Helsinki Swimming Stadium built.

1950s-1990s
 1950
 Linnanmäki amusement park opens.
 Population: 368,519.
 1951 - Marimekko founded.
 1952
 Helsinki Airport opens.
 1952 Summer Olympics held in Helsinki.
 1956 -  becomes mayor.
 1957 - Kansan Uutiset newspaper begins publication.
 1960
 Mosque established.
 Lake Bodom murders occur.
 1962
 City hosts World Festival of Youth and Students.
 Enzo-Gutzeit building constructed.
 1964 -  active.
 1965
 International Jean Sibelius Violin Competition begins.
 Helsinki City Theatre established.
 1966 - Helsinki Ice Hall opens.
 1967 - Sibelius Monument unveiled.
 1968
 Teuvo Aura becomes mayor.
 Helsinki Festival begins.
 1969 - Temppeliaukio Church consecrated.
 1970 - Helsinki Metropolitan Area Council created.
 1971 - Finlandia Hall built.
 1973 - Population: 510,614 city; 821,505 urban agglomeration.
 1975
 Helsinki Accords.
 Helsinki Exhibition and Convention Centre built.
 1979
 Raimo Ilaskivi becomes mayor.
 Lepakkoluola formed.
 Helsinki Theatre Academy founded.
 1980
 Iltalehti newspaper begins publication.
 Ring I highway constructed.
 Population: 483,675.
 1982
 Helsinki Metro begins operating.
 Sibelius Academy active.
 1984 - Itäkeskus shopping mall built.
 1986 - Mosque founded.
 1989 - Night of the Arts begins.
 1990 - Finnish National Gallery established.
 1991
 Linux software created by university student.
 Kari Rahkamo becomes mayor.
 1993
 Helsinki Opera House opens.
 National Defence College (Finland) established.
 1995
 Spårakoff pub tram begins operating.
 Population: 515,765.
 1996
 Eva-Riitta Siitonen becomes mayor.
 Helsinki Motor Show begins.
 1997
 Taloussanomat newspaper begins publication.
 Hartwall Areena opens.
 1998 - Kiasma museum inaugurated.
 1999 - Finnkino Tennispalatsi (cinema) opens.

21st century

 2002 - 11 October: Myyrmanni bombing occurs in nearby Vantaa.
 2005 - Jussi Pajunen becomes mayor.
 2007
 Helsinki Metropolia University of Applied Sciences established.
 Haaga-Helia University of Applied Sciences formed.
 Eurovision Song Contest 2007 held.
 2009
 Helsinki Regional Transport Authority formed.
 Kumpula Garden opens.
 Prisma Itäkeskus shopping centre built.
 2010 - Aalto University formed.
 2011
 Restaurant Day begins.
 Sipoonkorpi National Park established.
 Helsinki Music Centre built.
 Helsinki Region Infoshare launched.
 2012
 Population: 596,233.
 City designated World Design Capital.
 2017
 Jan Vapaavuori becomes mayor.

See also
 History of Helsinki
 Politics of Helsinki

References

This article incorporates information from the Finnish Wikipedia and German Wikipedia.

Bibliography

 
 
 
 
 
 
 
  1905–1908, 5 vols.

External links

 Europeana. Items related to Helsinki, various dates.
 Digital Public Library of America. Items related to Helsinki, various dates

 
Helsinki
Helsinki-related lists
Years in Finland
Helsinki